The Shintetsu Kobe Kosoku Line (神戸電鉄神戸高速線 Kōbe Dentetsu Kōbe Kōsoku sen) is one of two lines owned by the Kobe Rapid Transit Railway (0.4 km). It is operated by Kobe_Electric_Railway and has only two stations. This short stretch of track, opened in 1968 is important as it connects the Arima Line to Shinkaichi, allowing Shintetsu passengers to transfer directly to Hankyū and Hanshin trains bound for Kobe Sannomiya and Umeda (Osaka), and Sanyo line trains bound for Himeji. As it is only used by Shintetsu rolling stock, the line is narrow gauge.

List of stations on the Kobe Kosoku Line

References
This article incorporates material from the corresponding article in the Japanese Wikipedia

Railway lines in Japan
Transport in Kobe